Jones Oladeinde Arogbofa (born November 10, 1952) is a retired  Brigadier General in the Nigerian Army who served as Chief of Staff to former President of Nigeria Goodluck Jonathan.

Early life 
Arogbofa was born in Oka Akoko, Ondo State. He attended Obafemi Awolowo University, Rochester Institute of Technology, University of Alabama, United States Army Command and General Staff College, University of Lagos, and University of Ibadan.

Career 
Arogbofa is a retired Brigadier General and was commissioned into the Nigerian Army in 1973. He became Chief of Staff to Goodluck Jonathan. He was succeeded by Abba Kyari. After Abba Kyari's death, Arogbofa made a statement by saying: “You must not embarrass the president in addressing issues. The chief of staff to the president must be trustworthy because the president must rely on the chief of staff and believe that you can’t join hands with others against him. The office is not a piece of cake”.

References 

People from Ondo State
1952 births
Living people

Brigadier generals
Yoruba military personnel
University of Lagos alumni
Obafemi Awolowo University alumni
University of Alabama alumni
Rochester Institute of Technology alumni
United States Army Command and General Staff College alumni